Los Nenes del Blin Blin is the debut mixtape by Puerto Rican duo Plan B. It was named after some of the nicknames of Chencho and Maldy. Thus the album was never officially released, they dropped a demo album which was free.

Track listing

2005 albums
Plan B (duo) albums